Chersoo is a village located 4 km from Awantipora town in the Pulwama district of the Kashmir valley of Jammu and Kashmir, India. It is situated on the banks of Jhelum river. The  Srinagar-Jammu National Highway passes through the village.

Location 

Charsoo Awantipora is a village situated 4 km from Awantipora town of Pulwama district of Kashmir valley. It is situated on the banks of river Jehlum. It is located on the Srinagar-Jammu National Highway. Its proximity to River Jhelum (including its distributaries) makes it vulnerable to flooding. The devastating floods of 2014 submerged the village, thereby having a great impact on its economy.

Census details 

It has a population of 3762 souls. The number of literates are 1570. The number of households are 486. It has a sex ratio of 1007(approx.). The total number of workers are 1436. 100% people living in this village are Muslims.

Health facilities 

It has newly constructed Primary Health Center which provides basic health care facilities to people living in the village and it's adjoining areas.

Education 

It has a government higher secondary institute at the central location of the village, two middle schools and three other primary schools in other parts. It has also a private school named "Ever Green English Medium Public High School" in its central location, near the higher secondary institute.

Economy

A good number of people are employed as teachers, engineers, doctors, etc. Paddy is the common agricultural product of the village but a large number of people are attached with Bat industries. The economy of the village mostly comes from the exports of lakhs of cricket bats to the outside states. 
The cricket bat industry faces severe losses over the years, however the recent Economic Development Policy by Lieutenant Governor lead UT government of Jammu & Kashmir boosted the business and added more to the economy of village.

References

Villages in Pulwama district